The SIG Sauer P320 is a modular semi-automatic pistol made by SIG Sauer, Inc., SIG Sauer's American branch. It is a further development of the SIG Sauer P250, utilizing a striker-fired mechanism in lieu of a double action only hammer system. The P320 can be chambered in 9×19mm Parabellum, .357 SIG, .40 S&W, .45 ACP, and 10mm Auto and can be easily converted from one caliber to another; a change from .357 SIG to .40 S&W requires only a barrel change; a change between 9mm to .357 SIG or .40 S&W and vice versa are accomplished using a caliber exchange kit.

The P320 chambered in 9×19 mm Parabellum was introduced in the North American market on 15 January 2014, followed by the .45 ACP compact model at the SHOT Show in January 2015. On 19 January 2017, it was announced that a customized version of the SIG Sauer P320 had won the United States Army's XM17 Modular Handgun System competition. The full-sized model will be known as the M17 and the compact carry-sized model will be known as the M18.

Design details

Features
The P320 was designed to be ambidextrous in handling, sporting a catch lever on both sides of the slide and user-reversible magazine release, and all other operating controls are designed so they can be operated from either side.  The firearm can be field stripped with no tools.  Additionally, the firearm can also be field stripped without depressing the trigger, an additional safety feature to prevent negligent discharge of the weapon. The fire control unit is removable, allowing to switch to a different frame size.

Trigger system
The P320 trigger shoe is available in an all-metal, solid trigger.

M17 and M18

The requirements for the new US Army handgun included the idea that an existing handgun model would be preferred for the Modular Handgun System Request for Proposal, known as the XM17 Procurement. SIG Sauer submitted a P320 with a number of modifications and submitted them for the XM17 Modular Handgun System competition.

Modifications include:
  barrel length in carry size pistol
  barrel length in full size pistol
 Ambidextrous thumb safety 
 chambered in 9 × 19 mm Luger (can be adapted to fire larger calibers like .357 SIG, .40 S&W, and .45 ACP)
 Improved slide sub-assembly to capture small components when disassembled
 Improved trigger "mud flap" to prevent foreign debris from entering the pistol action
 Loaded chamber indicator
 Pistols chambered in 9 mm can feature a 17-round magazine as standard with optional 21-round extended magazines available.
 Slide cut-out to facilitate the addition of a reflex sight. (This is the slide from the RX Series)

On 19 January 2017, it was announced that the SIG Sauer P320 MHS variant had won the United States Military's Modular Handgun System trials. The P320 will be known as the M17 (full size) and M18 (compact) in U.S. Military service. Though the pistol will remain chambered in 9 × 19 mm Luger rather than a larger caliber, the contract allows the services to procure SIG Sauer's proposed XM1152 Full Metal Jacket and XM1153 Special Purpose ammunition. The ammunition chosen to go with the pistol is a "Winchester jacketed hollow point" round.

In May 2017, the Army announced that the first unit that will receive the M17 would be the 101st Airborne Division by the end of the year. At the same time, the rest of the U.S. Armed Forces revealed they also intend to acquire the handgun, making it the standard sidearm for the entire U.S. military. The services plan to procure up to 421,000 weapons in total; 195,000 for the Army, 130,000 for the Air Force, 61,000 for the Navy (XM18 compact version only), and 35,000 for the Marines.

On 17 November 2017, soldiers of the 101st Airborne received the first XM17 and XM18 pistols, with over 2,000 handguns delivered. The XM17 has better accuracy and ergonomics and tighter dispersion than the M9. It will also be fielded more widely, being issued down to squad and fireteam leaders; while special forces would dual-arm all of its members with a pistol and rifle, previously junior leaders in regular infantry units were excluded from carrying sidearms but policy was changed to give them more choices and options in close quarters battle situations. All Army units are planned to have the M9 replaced with the M17 within a decade.

Reliability 
Initial production models of the P320 were found to have a "drop safety" issue if the firearm was dropped at a specific angle, potentially causing it to discharge. SIG Sauer has since refitted the P320 to make it drop-safe and offers a voluntary upgrade program for early P320s.

Apart from its initial issues, the P320 has proven itself to be an extremely reliable pistol for civilian, law enforcement and military use. Many police departments in the US and around the world have started issuing their officers P320s.

Around 400 P320s were procured for the Canadian Joint Task Force 2 special forces unit (JTF-2) in 2019, but these were withdrawn and the earlier P226 pistols (also manufactured by SIG Sauer) reinstated following a misfire that injured a soldier during a training exercise in November 2020; JTF-2 was the only Canadian military unit using the P320. In June 2021, a technical investigation found that the misfire was due to "a partial depression of the trigger by a foreign object combined with simultaneous movement of the slide [...] that then allowed a round to be fired whilst the pistol was still holstered" and that the usage of a holster designed for a different pistol was a contributory factor; the P320 itself was not at fault nor were there any issues with how it had been procured by Canadian defence officials (since questions had been raised as to whether these officials were aware of the drop safety issues). However, the pistols would remain in storage pending a third-party safety assessment. The safety assessment and other proceedings related to the misfire were concluded by June 2022, with a decision to reinstate the P320 being taken towards the end of that month.

Variants

X Series Models 

The X Series lineup includes the following grip module sizes:

 Cd .357 SIG.  The full-size slide also fits the carry-size grip module without any part of the recoil spring showing.
 Full size – Fits any SIG P320 full-size slide in 9mm, .40 S&W, and .357 SIG

In January 2019, SIG Sauer announced the XCompact handgun as the newest entry in their X Series lineup.

 Compact size – As of March 2020, the P320 XCompact is available in 9mm only.

The XCompact size grip module is the smallest grip module SIG currently carries, as they have not come out with a subcompact X Series grip module to date.

In May 2022, SIG Sauer announced a 10mm Auto P320 variant, named the P320 XTEN.

XFive Legion 
Released in late July/early August 2019 the XFIVE Legion is considered the flagship of the P320 platform that brings added weight and features.  The TXG grip module has tungsten infused directly into the polymer along with an attachable magazine well.  It comes standard with Henning group aluminum base pads and a skeletonized flat trigger.  The complete 9mm slide is has lightening cuts in the top to reduce weight and assist in recoil.  It is also optics ready through the removal of the rear sight plate assembly. The optics cut is the Delta Point/Romeo 1 Pro profile, but will accommodate multiple optics via adapter plates. .

P320-XTEN
The SIG P320-XTENMAX is a 10mm Auto chambered X Series variant of the P320, released in 2022. It features an X Series grip module, bull barrel, flat X Series trigger and a Nitron-finished stainless steel slide with a cut for mounting aiming optics. Magazine capacity is 15 rounds.

P320MAX 
The SIG P320MAX is a sporterised variant of the P320, designed in 2021 for use by competition shooters.

Drop firing problem
In late July 2017, the Dallas Police Department in Texas instructed all personnel to stop carrying the P320 pending an investigation.  There were concerns that the firearm may discharge when it is dropped and the back of the slide hits the ground at a 33-degree angle.  The problem was thought to be related to the trigger weight; some triggers were heavy enough that they essentially continued to move due to inertia after the gun hit the ground.  Internet publications, such as TheTruthAboutGuns.com, conducted independent tests that appeared to confirm potential drop firings (at a 40 percent rate).

On 8 August 2017, SIG Sauer issued a notice that they would upgrade all P320s to address the issue. The upgrade is described on the company's website as: "an alternate design that reduces the physical weight of the trigger, sear, and striker while additionally adding a mechanical disconnector."

The Fraternal Order of Police's Wisconsin state lodge recommended in mid-September 2022 for the state's police departments to stop using the weapon, claiming three Milwaukee Police officer injuries involving them or their partner's service weapons firing without any trigger pressure since 2020.

Lawsuits

Steyr Arms, Inc. v. Sig Sauer, Inc.
In May 2017, Steyr Mannlicher filed a patent infringement lawsuit against SIG Sauer. Steyr refers to their patent US6260301 (filed in 1999 and approved in 2001), which is for a handgun with a removable chassis. Steyr Arms requested a preliminary and permanent injunction against SIG Sauer selling any such firearms. On 11 March 2020, the United States District Court for the District of New Hampshire found that SIG Sauer did not infringe Steyr's patents, and dismissed all motions.

David Hartley, et al. v. Sig Sauer, Inc.
A lawsuit related to the above-noted drop firing problem and filed in April 2018 in the United States District Court for the Western District of Missouri led to a class action settlement in February 2020. Elements of the agreement include:
 Communication that the mechanical disconnector added via the P320 voluntary upgrade program "provides an additional level of safety," to be advised via the SIG Sauer website and direct customer communication
 Extension of the voluntary upgrade program for 24 months past the settlement date
 For anyone who submitted their P320 to the voluntary upgrade program and was charged for repairs, a refund of such charges
 For anyone who submitted their P320 to the voluntary upgrade program and was told it was unrepairable, a refund of the purchase price or a new P320
A class action settlement form is available on the SIG Sauer website.

Derick Ortiz v. Sig Sauer, Inc.
In September 2019, an Arizona gun owner who purchased a P320 in September 2016 initiated a class action lawsuit. It claims that SIG Sauer "continued to sell the flawed gun to the public", and that the upgrade offered "would still not fully compensate him for the significantly diminished resale value of his pistol." In March 2020, judge Joseph N. Laplante denied SIG Sauer's motion to dismiss the case. In May 2020, a trial notice was issued, with pretrial statements due on 5 October 2021; in January 2021, the due date for pretrial statements was revised to 1 February 2022.

Armendariz v. Sig Sauer, Inc. 
On 30 November 2022, a lawsuit was filed in U.S. federal court alleging several P320 pistols unintentionally fired "without the trigger being pulled or deliberately actuated by the user." The lawsuit claims there have been "over 100 incidents" of such discharges, "many of which have caused severe injury." An attorney representing the lawsuit's plaintiffs, Robert Zimmerman, said it was the largest lawsuit against SIG Sauer involving the P320 on behalf of people who were injured. The twenty plaintiffs in the case (twenty individuals and about a dozen spouses) are from thirteen different states.

Users
{| class="wikitable"
|+
!Country
!Organization/Notes
!Model
!Reference
|-
|:
|Australian Defence Force: In 2022, the P320 XCarry Pro was selected to replace the Browning Hi-Power.
|P320 XCarry
|
|-
|
|Cuerpo de Policía Nacional (National Police Corps)
|P320
|
|-
| rowspan="2" |:
|Civil Police of Ceará State

Military Police of Ceará State
|P320
|
|-
|Military Police of Goiás State
|P320
|
|-
|
|Canadian Armed Forces: Procured for Canadian Special Operations Forces Command in 2019. Continued introduction throughout 2022 for Canadian Special Forces. On 7 October 2022, it was announced that the P320 was selected to replace the Browning Hi-Power as the new regular force service pistol. It will be designated the C22 in Canadian service.
|P320
C22
|
|-
|
|Public Force of Costa Rica: Adopting P320 9mm as national service handgun.
|P320
|
|-
|
|Ministry of Defense: P320 XCarry selected as standard issue sidearm. Deliveries set to be completed by the end of 2019.
|P320
|
|-
| rowspan="2" |:
|French National Railway Company Security: replacing the Ruger SP101 revolver.
|P320
|
|-
|Wasquehal Municipal Police
|P320
|
|-
|:
|Indonesian National Police
|P320
| 
|-
|:
|National Guard of Mexico: Placed order of 50,000 P320 9mm pistols in April 2020
|P320 9mm
|
|-
|:
|Norwegian Police Service: Adopted the P320XCarry in 2019, replacing the SIG Sauer P226 and Heckler & Koch P30.
|P320 XCarry
|
|-
|
|Grupo Especial de Operaciones: the police tactical unit of Spain's National Police Corps currently adoption P320 Pro 9mm handguns.
|P320
|
|-
|
|St. Gallen Police
|P320
|
|-
|
|Royal Thai Police: purchased 152,468 SIG Sauer P320 pistols in December 2017
|P320
|
|-
|
|Armed Forces of Ukraine
|P320 M18
|
|-
|
|West Midlands Police: The P320 replaces the P229 9mm.
|P320 9mm
|
|-
| rowspan="32" |
|United States Armed Forces: On 19 January 2017, the P320 was chosen to replace the Beretta M9 as the United States Armed Forces' main service pistol in response to the request for a Modular Handgun System (MHS).
|M17
M18
|
|-
|United States Department of Veterans Affairs Police: the P320 replaces the SIG Sauer P229R DAK 9mm.
|P320 9mm
|
|-
|United States Immigration and Customs Enforcement
|P320 9mm
| 
|-
|United States National Park Service
|P320 9mm
|
|-
|Braintree, Massachusetts Police Department
|P320 .45ACP
|
|-
|Cambridge, Massachusetts Police Department
|P320
| 
|-
|Somerville, Massachusetts Police Department
|P320
|
|-
|Chicago Police Department
|P320
|
|-
|Dallas Police Department
|P320
|
|-
|Hawaii Department of Public Safety
|P320
|
|-
|Oklahoma Highway Patrol
|P320
|
|-
|Pasco County Sheriff's Office 
|P320
|
|-
|Texas Department of Public Safety
|P320
| 
|-
|North Miami, Florida Police Department
|P320
|
|-
|Virginia State Police
|P320
| 
|-
|Ventura County, California Sheriff's Office
|P320
| 
|-
|Manchester, New Hampshire Police Department
|P320
|
|-
|Concord, New Hampshire Police Department: the P320 replaces the SIG Sauer P229R .45ACP.
|P320 9mm
|
|-
|Portsmouth, New Hampshire Police Department
|P320
|
|-
|Newington, New Hampshire Police Department
|P320
| 
|-
|Tampa, Florida Police Department: the P320 replaces the Smith & Wesson M&P .40S&W.
|P320
|
|-
|Lloyd Harbor, New York Police Department
|P320
| 
|-
|Delaware State Police
|P320
|
|-
|Milwaukee Police Department
|P320
|
|-
|Sumnter, South Carolina Police Department
|P320
|
|-
|Newark, Delaware Police Department
|P320
| 
|-
|Miami Beach, Florida Police Department: the P320 XCarry was chosen as the department's new duty sidearm in 2021, replacing the Smith & Wesson M&P .40S&W.
|P320 XCarry 9mm
|
|-
|Bay Area Rapid Transit Police Department
|P320 9mm
|
|-
|Nevada Highway Patrol
|P320 9mm
|
|-
|Virginia Division of Capitol Police
|P320 9mm
|
|-
|Ames, Iowa Police Department
|P320
|
|-
|Puerto Rico Police
|P320 9mm
|
|}

References

External links

 101st AIRBORNE First to Fire the M17 M18 MHS Modular Handgun System (SIG P320) via YouTube
  P320 page
 SIG P320 by Hickok45 via YouTube

.357 SIG semi-automatic pistols
.40 S&W semi-automatic pistols
.45 ACP semi-automatic pistols
9mm Parabellum semi-automatic pistols
10mm Auto semi-automatic pistols
Police weapons
SIG Sauer semi-automatic pistols
Modular firearms
Weapons and ammunition introduced in 2014
Semi-automatic pistols of the United States